Edward Cranston Campbell (26 August 1916, Glasgow – 4 April 2006, Tunbridge Wells) was a British journalist, and an acknowledged authority on circuses and the training of wild animals.

Career
Campbell began his journalistic career in the late 1930s with Kemsley Newspapers in Glasgow. He moved to Fleet Street in 1956, where he worked for the Evening Standard, the Evening News and the Sunday Dispatch.

Books
Campbell also authored books, among them Jungle Be Gentle, the ghost-written "autobiography" of his friend, the German animal trainer Hans Brick, and The People of the Secret, published by Idries Shah's Octagon Press, under the pseudonym "Ernest Scott".

References

External links
 Obituary on thestage.co.uk
 Some Unusual Aspects of Communication (Monograph authored by Campbell)

1916 births
2006 deaths
British male journalists
British non-fiction writers
British spiritual writers
20th-century non-fiction writers